This is a list of the United States state navies in the American Revolutionary War.

Beginning in 1775 after the American Revolutionary War, eleven of the thirteen colonies established state navies or owned one or more armed vessels.
 Some (like that of Massachusetts) were established prior to the creation of the Continental Navy.  They were usually created to provide some measure of coastal defense against the actions of the Royal Navy, Loyalist smugglers, British privateers, and pirates, or to assist in shore defenses.  Some navies, like those of New Hampshire and Georgia were quite small; New Hampshire only commissioned one ship.  Delaware and New Jersey were the only states that did not commission and operate any ships.

List of state navies
Connecticut State Navy
Georgia State Navy
Pennsylvania Navy
South Carolina Navy

States without navies

New Jersey never authorized the purchase of any ships, or established admiralty courts.  Both matters were proposed to the state assembly in 1776, but were not acted upon.

Delaware never authorized the purchase of armed vessels.  Some of its Committees of Safety apparently commissioned ships for specific purposes; the Farmer was commissioned by the Sussex County committee to sail to St. Eustatius to purchase gunpowder.

See also
Bibliography of early American naval history
Continental Navy

References

Bibliography
  This work contains summary information on each of the various state navies.

United States state navies